XHPVTP-FM is a radio station on 92.7 FM in Villa de Tamazulápam del Progreso, Oaxaca. It is known as La Picosita.

History
XHPVTP was awarded in the IFT-4 radio auction of 2017. The station signed on the air by October, becoming the town's first licensed commercial station. The only other station in town is a CORTV network repeater.

References

Radio stations in Oaxaca
Radio stations established in 2017
2017 establishments in Mexico